Alisha Lehmann (born 21 January 1999) is a Swiss professional footballer who plays as a forward for English FA WSL club Aston Villa and the Switzerland national team. She previously played for BSC YB Frauen of the Nationalliga A, for West Ham United of the FA WSL and on loan with Everton of the FA WSL.

Club career

BSC YB Frauen
Lehmann started her professional club career at Swiss club BSC YB Frauen and went on to score 25 goals in 52 league appearances during her time at the club.

West Ham United
Newly-professional FA Women's Super League's West Ham United signed Lehmann from BSC YB Frauen in August 2018. It was reported that West Ham manager Matt Beard had been impressed by Lehmann's performances at the 2018 UEFA Women's Under-19 Championship, which Switzerland hosted. In April 2019 West Ham extended Lehmann's contract after she scored nine goals in 30 appearances in all competitions and helped the club reach the Women's FA Cup final. By scoring the equalising goal in the semi final match against Reading.

Everton (loan)
On 27 January 2021, it was announced that Lehmann had moved to Everton on loan until the end of the season.

Aston Villa
Lehmann then joined Aston Villa for the 2021–22 season. In July 2022, she signed a one-year contract extension with Aston Villa for the 2022–23 season, having made 23 appearances and scored four goals during her first season at the club.

International career 
Lehmann won her first cap for the Switzerland national team in October 2017. She scored her first international goal on 2 March 2018 against Finland at the 2018 Cyprus Women's Cup.

Lehmann was not available for the Switzerland national team at the 2022 UEFA European Women's Football Championship because she felt that she was not "mentally ready" to be involved in the tournament.

Personal life 
Lehmann is openly bisexual. She formerly identified as lesbian. She previously dated Swiss national teammate Ramona Bachmann. She was in a relationship with Aston Villa midfielder Douglas Luiz in 2022.

In popular culture 
In 2019, Lehmann was featured in the BBC Three series Britain's Youngest Football Boss with her then girlfriend Ramona.

As of January 2023, she has more than 11.1m followers on Instagram and more than 165,000 followers on Twitter making her one of the world's most followed women's footballers on social media.

Career statistics

Club

International 

 As of match played 8 April 2022. Switzerland score listed first, score column indicates score after each Lehmann goal.

Honours 
West Ham United
 Women's FA Cup runner-up: 2018–19

Switzerland U17
 UEFA Women's Under-17 Championship runner-up: 2015

References

External links 

 
 Alisha Lehmann at Aston Villa W.F.C.
 Profile at Swiss Football Association 
 Profile at soccerdonna.de

1999 births
Living people
Swiss women's footballers
Expatriate women's footballers in England
Women's Super League players
Women's association football forwards
Switzerland women's international footballers
West Ham United F.C. Women players
Everton F.C. (women) players
Swiss expatriate women's footballers
Swiss expatriate sportspeople in England
Bisexual sportspeople
LGBT association football players
Swiss LGBT sportspeople
Swiss bisexual people
Association footballers' wives and girlfriends
BSC YB Frauen players
Swiss Women's Super League players
21st-century Swiss LGBT people
Aston Villa W.F.C. players
People from Bern-Mittelland District
Sportspeople from the canton of Bern